Arthur Sparke (5 June 1628 – 1677) was an English lawyer and politician who sat in the House of Commons in 1660.

Life and work

Birth 
Arthur was born on 5 June 1628, as the fifth (but third surviving) son of Thomas Sparke, the rector of Brown Candover parish.

Positions 
Sparke was a barrister of the Middle Temple, from 1651 to 1655 he served as the Town clerk in Hertford, and was also steward of the borough court from 1661 until 1675. In 1660, he was elected Member of Parliament for Hertford in the Convention Parliament. He was deputy to the King's Remembrancer in the Exchequer and a Justice of the Peace for Hertfordshire.

Family 
Sparke married Mary North, daughter of Hugh North of Marden in the parish of Tewin. With her he had at least two sons, the second of whom (Arthur Sparke) was born on 1 March 1661 but died on 12 January 1665 and was buried in the Church of St Mary the Virgin in Baldock.

Death 
He died at the age of 49 in 1677.

References

1628 births
1677 deaths
English MPs 1660
English lawyers
Members of the Middle Temple
People from Basingstoke and Deane